Elections to Croydon Council in London, England were held on 4 May 2002.  The council was up for election for the first time since the 1998 election.  The Labour Party managed to keep control of the council which it had done since 1994 when it took power from the Conservative Party. This year Labour held Croydon with a smaller majority, only clinging onto power through a tiny number of votes in its marginal wards - one councillor won by just eight votes.

37 Labour councillors, 32 Conservative councillors and 1 Liberal Democrat councillor were elected, maintaining Labour control of the Council. Subsequently, one Conservative councillor defected to Labour, defected back to the Conservatives, became an independent and then a Liberal Democrat.

Election result 

|}

Ward results

Addiscombe

Ashburton

Bensham Manor

Broad Green

Coulsdon East

Coulsdon West

Croham

Fairfield

Fieldway

Heathfield

Kenley

New Addington

Norbury

Purley

Sanderstead

Selhurst

Selsdon & Ballards

Shirley

South Norwood

Thornton Heath

Upper Norwood

Waddon

West Thornton

Woodside

External links 
BBC - Croydon Council election result

2002
2002 London Borough council elections